Pauline Alice Maier (née Rubbelke; April 27, 1938 – August 12, 2013) was a revisionist historian of the American Revolution, whose work also addressed the late colonial period and the history of the United States after the end of the Revolutionary War.  She was the William R. Kenan, Jr. Professor of American History at the Massachusetts Institute of Technology (MIT).

Maier achieved prominence over a fifty-year career of critically acclaimed scholarly histories and journal articles. She was a Fellow of the American Academy of Arts and Sciences and taught undergraduates. She authored textbooks and online courses. Her popular career included series with PBS and the History Channel. She appeared on Charlie Rose, C-SPAN2's In Depth and wrote 20 years for The New York Times review pages. Maier was the 2011 President of the Society of American Historians. She won the 2011 George Washington Book Prize for her book Ratification: The People Debate the Constitution, 1787–1788. She died in 2013 from lung cancer at the age of 75.

Life and career

Early life,  education, and family
Born in St. Paul, Minnesota in 1938 as Pauline Rubbelke, she attended parochial schools.  Her father was a firefighter and her mother was a homemaker with five children. On entering Radcliffe College as an undergraduate, her original ambition was to be in the newspaper business.

She was a writer on The Harvard Crimson and worked summers at the Quincy, Massachusetts Patriot Ledger. She graduated from Radcliffe in 1960 with a bachelor's degree in history and literature. It was on the Crimson that she met her future husband, Charles S. Maier. After graduation, they both attended schools at Oxford on fellowships, she as a Fulbright Scholar at the London School of Economics and Political Science.  On completing their studies, they married and toured Europe together.

The couple returned to Harvard University to pursue doctoral degrees, Charles in European history, and Pauline in 20th century urban studies in line with her interest in contemporary politics. But after taking Bernard Bailyn's "Colonial and Revolutionary America" seminar, she said, "Once you get into the 18th century, you never get out." Pauline and Charles earned their PhD degrees at Harvard, and Charles began a career there. They raised two daughters and a son in Cambridge, Massachusetts. Maier pursued gardening and cooking at the family weekend home.

Career

Maier taught at University of Massachusetts Boston for nine years, and one year at the University of Wisconsin before taking her position at Massachusetts Institute of Technology in 1978 as William R. Kenan, Jr. Professor of American History. Her career included various appointments in five prestigious universities, and numerous fellowships and awards. Her lecture classes through 2011 included three courses of Early American history, and she co-taught "Riots, Strikes and Conspiracies in American History" with urban historian Robert M. Fogelson.

Maier chaired a university-wide committee at MIT in 1985 to re-organize its humanities schools and broaden and structure its programs. Its adopted recommendations expanded women's studies, awarded specific area degrees, and initiated a doctoral program collaborating history and anthropology under Dean Ann Fetter Friedlaender. MIT's faculty voted Maier the Killian Award in 1998, given annually to one senior faculty member for outstanding achievement. The recipient presents on their professional activities over their Lecturer year.

In 1976, she became a member of the American Antiquarian Society. An offprint of its proceedings featured her "Boston and New York in the 18th Century" (1982). In the 1990s, Maier was a charter member of "The Historical Society" group among American Historical Association membership who were concerned about restrictive 'political correctness' and collegial civility. Maier was elected as an American Academy of Arts and Sciences “History Fellow” in 1998. In 2010, Maier became one of two women honorary members of the Colonial Society of Massachusetts since 1947.

Maier was the 2011 President of the Society of American Historians (SAH), an affiliate of the American Historical Association. It is dedicated to literary distinction in history and biography. The society's past presidents include Allan Nevins, Eric Foner, James M. McPherson, and David McCullough.

In 2012, President Obama appointed Maier to the James Madison Memorial Fellowship Foundation Board of Trustees. The foundation was created by Congress in 1986 as part of the bicentennial celebration of the Constitution and offers $24,000 graduate-level fellowships to secondary teachers to undertake a master's degree which emphasizes the study of the Constitution.jamesmadison.gov

Writing
Maier's writing is characterized as serious and unadorned, with a crossover appeal from scholars to intelligent readers who enjoy a well-told story of well-researched scholarly history. In Ratification, Maier attributed her storytelling ability to Barbara Tuchman's insight that the writer can build suspense by never acknowledging a development until the characters in the narrative could know it.

Professionally, her research-writing technique was self-described as looking for something comparative to come up with new questions. For example, in American Scripture, she found over 90 local declarations and then compared them to that of the Second Continental Congress.  Popular support for the Declaration of Independence was built on how much was known and how widely the newspapers circulated. Massachusetts did not control Virginia, there was a confluence of ideas, assumptions, and similar responses to similar events.

As a popular history writer, she sought to understand her subjects as humans as well as their causes. Personal elements may not be important to public life, but they are the kinds of things people want to know. In Hamilton's famous phrase, he was "unfaithful to my wife, but not to my country." Historians always ask, What did they do for the public?

Teaching teachers

Maier won fellowships to write curriculum for college courses and high school teachers. She believed that the interest in American history was not tapped in the curriculum of many states. As a democratic country, the U.S. should give any student a background knowledge of what happened to make the Declaration and the Constitution, and how their uses changed. Assumed things were not always so, students should understand how things can and do change. "Every time you understand what's distinctive about a different time, you are understanding what is distinctive about our time."

Scholarship

The Neo-Whigs

Maier's scholarship belongs to the "Neo-Whig" school of historiography founded by Bernard Bailyn in reaction to the "Progressive" historians. Her work is likened to that of Gordon S. Wood and Edmund S. Morgan. Radical English libertarian thought changed American beliefs and society and culture. The spreading ideas of natural rights and individual liberty distinctively altered politics, economy and society. These are explained with political analysis apart from ideology, incorporating English and French sources.

Neo-Whigs of the 1950s forward avoided the triumphalism of the 1930s 'Whig historians' of the Revolution. The neo-Whigs added empire perspective, explored Patriot differences among colonies and within each colony, and added treatment of Tory elements. Maier's account of evolving Patriot differences is "Ratification: The People Debate the Constitution 1787–1788". Still, neo-Whigs have critics who see no causal imperative to revolution by Lockean ideals. Maier's account of the connections is found in "American Scripture: The Making of the Declaration of Independence".

Neo-Whigs versus neo-Progressives

In contrast to the neo-Whigs, neo-Progressives explain many developments as a conservative return to Coke's 'Rights of Englishmen', a reaction to economic imperatives of expanding Empire.
The British of all classes everywhere in the empire were more free than any in the world. Neo-progressives show that the structural economic change in the English Atlantic empire and local profit margins counted as much for merchants and planters as a colonial concern for Parliament's enactments. Control of domestic markets motivated as much as rights and ideals. The Neo-Whigs have difficulty explaining a tipping point from mild protest to sustained violence. At times they have not accounted for the exodus by Tories and ex-slave British. 'Liberty' in 1776 meant different things to different people. Maier's take is found in "From Resistance to Revolution: Colonial Radicals and the Development of American Opposition to Britain, 1765–1776".

Neo-Whigs in general answer that doctrine of every kind was underpinned by a colonial social reality that was by its nature uncertain and unstable. Nevertheless, they are charged with favoring those who could read and write. Social historians expanded historical inquiry into urban labor movements and rural militias. Maier contributed to the wider sensibility with her article "Popular Uprisings in 18th Century America" in the William and Mary Quarterly, featured in a reissue of their 50-year best. And while neo-Whigs can explain much of later social, economic and political transformation, see Maier's "Revolutionary Origins of the American Corporation", there still remains how marginalized populations (day-laborers, women, blacks slave and free, Amerindians) should be incorporated into the narrative of the American Revolution.

Expanding 'early American' history

Indeed, whatever was once "Early American History" is changed and changing. The field is 'imperialistically' reaching chronologically forward fifty years and backwards a century. It has spread geographically over the entire continent and across Atlantic communities. It topically encompasses slavery, gender, ethnicity and borderland outliers. The new intellectual fault line is methodological, based on differences in research standards and how to relate theory and archival research.

A recent collection by Donald A. Yerxa looks towards finding a 'reconceptualization' of the field with chronological bounds based on newly researched continuity and change, along with more coherent themes. Maier's section was a forum on historiography, Peter C. Mancall led 'the colonial period', and  Gordon S. Wood started 'revolution and early republic'. Maier began the historiography section with three "Disjunctions" based on her previous work at NEH and a newly written rejoinder following comments by five other scholars.

In the first disjunction considered by Maier, the social 'Colonial' history is unlike the predominantly political and ideological 'Revolution' history. Colonial history from the Amerindian experience reaches a discontinuity at a time when U.S. imperialism overtakes earlier Hispanic developments in the 1800s. Maier agreed, "a disjunction in historical research is not a disjunction in history." The challenge is to find a bridge from modern fruitful research into the previous scholarship based on national boundaries. The second disjunction is between scholarly interests and the general public. Younger scholars are dropping the history of white men's politics. While bestsellers are written on Franklin, Washington, Adams, and '1776', many modern, cultural historians shun white male elites. "Nation" is dismissed as an imagined or invented construct and 'nationalism' in their critique lacks explanatory power for inclusive historical analysis.

Maier's third disjunction, related to the second, is between historical scholarship and history taught in secondary schools and college survey courses. While social and cultural historians add to the body of the scholarly literature in their professional careers, Maier asks, "why not synthesize and perpetuate the contributions of previous (political, military and diplomatic) scholars, at least in the classroom?" (Related on this page, see references to Maier's work in two fellowships at National Endowment of Humanities, Guggenheim Foundation, Annenberg Foundation, PBS, History Channel, and textbooks referenced by scholars.)

Work
Paperback and ebook

These works are cited by scholars in the field as noted. Ebook, paperback, and audiobook editions offer easiest access to Maier's work. See titles re-listed below in "Books and scholarly articles" for approving and critical reviews, online interviews, panel discussion and lectures associated with each one.

 "Ratification: the People Debate" (2010) ebook. CD-audio. (paper 07/05/2011). “”Ratification”" Google books. Links to reviews, video below.
 "American Scripture: Making the Declaration of Independence". 140 scholarly cites. Links to reviews, video below.
 "The Declaration of Independence and the Constitution of the U.S." (2008), paper, ebook. "“Decl-Const"" 'Google books'. 10 scholar cites. See below.
 "From Resistance to Revolution ... ", paper. “”Resistance”" 'Google books'. 149 scholarly cites. Links to reviews, video below.
 "The Old Revolutionaries: Political Lives in the Age of Samuel Adams", paper. “”Revolutionaries”" Amazon 'look'. 36 scholarly cites. See below.

Books and scholarly articles

Books and scholarly articles

The ISBN links here and footnoted go to WP's "Book Sources" for direct links at "find this book" resources. These include online text, formatted bibliographical information, libraries, book sellers, book swappers.

Hardback editions
 "Ratification: The People Debate the Constitution, 1787–1788" (2010): The politics of the Constitution's ratification. Mining resources of "The Documentary History of the Ratification of the Constitution"

Maier won the George Washington Book Prize of 2011 for $50K. “MIT webpage" with reviews from the New York Times, Washington Post, Wall Street Journal" See notes for other generally favorable  perspectives.
 "American Scripture: Making the Declaration of Independence" (1997) The Declaration was written, venerated, and transformed; 90 "Declarations", Paine, Lincoln. NYT Book Review 1997 best 11.

See Gary Rosen's “Commentary” review Oct 1997 for a critical take on Maier's taking Jefferson down a peg. He recommends an alternative read that better fits 'Great Man' historiography. “Maier interview by Prof. Ann Withington” Audio WRPI-FM 1999 interview on "Scripture" in two parts. "BN Scripture synopsis".

 "The Old Revolutionaries: Political Lives in the Age of Samuel Adams" (1980) Five revolutionaries of diverse motivations in common cause. 
 "The Declaration of Independence and the Constitution of the United States" (1998, 2008) paper. A 25-page introductory essay by Maier briefly describes the writing of the Declaration and of the Constitution. 
 "From Resistance to Revolution: Colonial Radicals and the Development of American Opposition to Britain, 1765–1776" (1972, 1992) The officers of the Sons of Liberty came from the middle and upper classes.  "BN Resistance synopsis"

Co-authored and contributed chapters

 "Declaring Independence" (2010) second edition. Univ. of Virginia Library. by Christian Yves Dupont, ed., Maier's essay, "Who really wrote the Declaration of Independence". also David McCulloch, Robert G. Parkinson, David Armitage, Robert M.S. McDonald, Justice Sandra Day O'Conner. 
 "American Revolution" (2009) by Charlene Mires, ed. Maier writes a chapter "The path toward independence". Others: Don Higginbotham, Gary B. Nash, Gordon S. Wood, Jimmy Carter. 
"Why does America have the Constitution of 1787?: new historical perspectives" by Joseph F. Cullon, Pauline Maier, Jack N. Rakove, Woody Holton, Max M. Edling. Dartmouth College. Video, DVD 88 min. (May, 2009) 
“”Abraham Lincoln: great American historians” on our 16th President" (2008) second edition by Brian Lamb. Ebook. Book. Maier writes an essay in Part 3, Character, "The Declaration's Influence", p. 212. 
 "Declaration of Independence", an entry in e-document "Dictionary of American History". Charles Scribner's Sons
 “Declaring Independence: the origin and influence of America’s founding document: featuring the Albert H. Small Declaration of Independence Collection” (2008) First edition. Christian Yves, ed. by Joseph J. Ellis, Annette Gordon-Reed, Charles A. Miller, Peter S. Onuf, Garry Wills. Pauline Maier wrote the chapter, "Who really wrote the Declaration of Independence?" in both first and second editions. 
 "Thomas Jefferson, Genius of Liberty" (2000) J. Joseph, Annette Gordon-Reed, Pauline Maier, ... 
“Interdisciplinary study of the American Revolution” (1976) Greene, Jack P., and Pauline Maier. 

Scholarly articles

 "Lacroix – the ideological origins of American federalism" The William and Mary quarterly. 67, no. 3, (2010): 557 
 "America unabridged – the young republic: 1787 to 1860" American Heritage (December 2004) p. 32  
 "The Revolutionary Origins of the American Corporation", The William and Mary Quarterly, Jan., 1993, vol. 50, no. 1, pp. 51–84.  74 scholarly citations. 
"Interdisciplinary Studies of the American Revolution", Pauline Maier and Jack P. Greene. (Maier led on article, Greene led on book.) Journal of Interdisciplinary History, Spring, 1976, vol. 6, no. 4, pp. 543–544 
 "Popular Uprisings in Eighteenth-Century America", Reprint of 50-year best: William and Mary Quarterly. 1, (1999): 138 ; original: WMQ: A Magazine of Early American History, Jan., 1970, vol. 27, no. 1, pp. 3–35. 103 scholarly citations.

Scholarly reviews
 “The Documentary History of the Ratification of the Constitution", vols. 19–23. review of primary source collection, WILLIAM AND MARY QUARTERLY, 68, no. 1, (2011): 155–159 
 “Plain Speaking” on McCullough's bio of John Adams, contrasting Ellis' view of Adams' temperament. NYT online 'Books', 05/27/2001.

Texts, Online courses
For a democracy to work, Maier would have its citizens to look beyond assumptions, to know how things can and do change." To "synthesize and perpetuate the contributions of previous scholars … in the classroom," she writes college textbooks and uses them to teach undergraduates. Maier writes online courses available at her university and used by other universities

Beyond traditional college offerings, Maier integrated participatory learning, political history and social history in a collaboration with online MUVE gaming project in a format that younger "digital divide" learners find engaging. She reaches out to students before college in texts used in high schools for Advanced Placement courses and previously in a text for middle schoolers with a braille edition. She connects with secondary teachers through the "Teaching American History" courses. She has been a TAH presenter and her books are used for required readings in college credit courses around the country for high school teachers to acquire a better background in American history.

Texts

 "America's Documents of Freedom" (2009) by Goldhil Video. Greg Heimer narrator. 11 DVD-Rs, panel. Pauline Maier, John Smolenski, Robert George, Wilson Smith. For junior high/high school. Stories behind important documents in U.S. History. 
 ""Inventing America":a History of the United States"  (2006) college textbook. Even when invented elsewhere, Americans adopt technology that alters their politics, economy, society.. First edition, chapters to 1800 by Maier. Maier lead author on second edition. 27 scholarly citations.

“American Heritage” interview by Smithsonian technology archivist. Video “Inventing America”. Four authors at Chicago Hist. Soc., C-SPAN.

Critical review by economist Sylvia Nasar in the New York Times, “A textbook case”, asserting insufficient attention to innovation and adoption, corporation and profit, societal distribution. The “Authors’ answer” is found in the NYT of October 6, 2002.

<blockquote>US History Skillbook with Writing Practice and Exercises" by Henry, M and Maier, P., Ed.2 use with "Inventing" ; "With U.S. History: A Document-Based Skillbook" by Maier, P.  Ed.2. use with "Inventing". 
 "The American People: A History” (1986) hardcover and braille. a survey textbook for junior-high-school students.

Online courses

 "Primary Sources: workshops in American History. Workshop 2 of 8. “Common Sense and the American Revolution”: the power of the printed word. Transcripts and Video. Maier lecture on Thomas Paine's "Common Sense".
 2001 WGBH Educational Foundation. Annenberg Foundation 2011.  Course credit. Virginia Polytechnic Institute. A “companion web site” to the video workshop series providing professional development resources for American history teachers.
 “The American Revolution”. "MIT open courseware" Undergraduate 21H.112 as taught in Spring 2006. viewed 05/08/2011. For an alternate online approach presenting similar material, see Joanne B. Freeman's lectures-only format, “The American Revolution” at 'Yale University Courses'.

Avatar virtual gaming
“Revolution” – virtual gaming, MITs Education Arcade, with Colonial Williamsburg. Microsoft iCampus. 2004. Pauline Maier historical collaboration with program authors Matthew Weise, Henry Jenkins, Kurt Squire. A seven-avatar Multi-User Virtual Environment (MUVE): conservative patriot burgess, tailoress entrepreneur, woman houseservant slave, male blacksmith, immigrant waitress, man fieldhand slave, carpenter.

Lectures and panel discussions
 See below under "Further reading"

Popular reviews and columns
Popular reviews and columns

Maier wrote popular book reviews and opinion columns for several periodicals, including the New York Times (NYT) Books, Arts and Opinion pages, all relating to her scholarly area of expertise. She occasionally appeared as a guest on radio talk programs. Maier was an advisor to History News Network out of George Mason University.

Washington Post reviews

“Liberty's exiles” 02/22/2011. Maier's approving review of Maya Jasanoff's well-written "Liberty's exiles: American loyalists in the Revolutionary world" and recalling Mary Beth Norton's 1970 prize-winning "British Americans".
Compare with Thomas H. Bender in the New York Times 05/01/2011 “The King's men, after the American Revolution”.

NYT Reviews

Looking at twenty years as a NYT reviewer, one can see an evolution from (a) 1980s family, women's and children's books, to (b) early to mid 1990s specialty monographs concerning the Revolutionary period, to (c) late 1990s big name authors and best sellers in her field. (Note: keep scrolling through the Arts page ads for text.)

“John Adams” May 27, 2001. Review of David McCullough's "John Adams". “The do-it-yourself society” March 1, 1998. On Paul Johnson's "A history of the American people". “Sparring for Liberty” November 1, 1998. On Eric Foner's "The story of American freedom". “James Madison made us up” July 3, 1988. On Edmund S. Morgan's "Inventing the people: the rise of popular sovereignty in England and America".

“Reversal of Fortune” November 16, 1997. on Richard M. Ketchum's "Saratoga: turning point of America's Revolutionary War". “Continent of conquest” July 14, 1996. On John Keegan's "Fields of battle: the wars for North America".  “The all-purpose bad guy” August 26, 1990. On Willard S. Randall's "Benedict Arnold: patriot and traitor".
“The dissertation that would not die” July 30, 1989. On Frank Bourgin's "The great challenge: the myth of laissez-faire in the Early Republic".

“Children’s books: … getting it right” reviewing ten children's books on Revolution and Constitution. “A world of women” December 12, 1982. On Barbara Strachey's "Remarkable relations: the story of the Pearsall Smith women". “Victorian Women, including Victoria” May 16, 1982. On Janet H. Murray's "Strong-minded women and other lost voices from 19th Century England".  “A marriage that worked” September 1981. On Lynne Withey's "Dearest friend: a life of Abigail Adams".

NYT Opinion

“Justice Breyer’s sharp aim” December 21, 2010.  “Jefferson, Real and Imagined” July 4, 1997.

Radio

“Costa Report” interview with California-based Rebecca D. Costa's radio show features research based scholars with unconventional takes on nonpartisan 'PBS content'. Costa's “Maier interview” KSCO radio, February 4, 2011. Viewed 05/16/2001.  “Wilson Center”, 'strengthening the fruitful relations between the world of learning and the world of public affairs'.  "Dialogue Radio: “#946 ‘Ratification’”, December 19–26, 2010. Viewed 05/16/2001.

TV and video series
 See below under "Further reading"

References

Further reading

Lectures and panel discussions

Teaching The Nation's History 2004 Adaptation of a speech delivered to a National Endowment for the Humanities forum.
“You Teach History at MIT?” 2003. Lecture at Alumni Association. Running time 56:37.
“Interview with Charlie Rose” (July 4, 1997) 54 minutes.
American Scripture 1997 Description of a lecture Maier delivered before the Library of Congress
What Was The Declaration Of Independence 1997 Interview with David Gergen.

TV and video series and programs

 "Dialogue Television" video “ #2263 ‘Ratification’, December 8–12, 2010. Viewed 05/16/2001. Woodrow Wilson International Center for Scholars, 'strengthening the fruitful relations between the world of learning and the world of public affairs'.
 They made America 2004 Maier in "Revolution", then "Newcomers", "Gamblers", "Rebels".
“Liberty! Liberty!” PBS Series, 2004. Liberty! “The Boston Tea Party”. PBS, video of Maier describing the event.
 "Revolutionaries" 2004 – PBS series of thirteen, Episode 3. The Chess Master (1776–90), Franklin's diverse and crucial roles.
 ”The Founding Fathers”. History Channel series
 “The Adams Chronicles” NEH project
 “Benjamin Franklin” 2002 (PBS TV mini-series documentary) – advisor
 Biography of America: "Annenberg Learner"'s  WGBH production of Biography of America (2000) "New world encounters". P. Maier et al., "The Coming of Independence". P. Maier,  “The new system of government”,  P. Maier, "Westward expansion". Maier, another and host.  Maier shows here an example of the new "Early American History" where it stretches a century past and fifty years forward.
 “Founding Fathers” 2000 – TV mini-series documentary. Four episodes on rebels, liberties, revolution, constitution.

Innovative places of scholarship
In her scholarly career, Pauline Maier found collaborative work among many academic institutions. These most often practiced interdisciplinary, multi-cultural study which broke through artificial chronologies. "A disjunction in historical research is not a disjunction in history." (in Donald Yerxa book) Below is a sampling.

Scholarship
 “Center for the study of the American Constitution”, Madison, Wisconsin. Sponsor substantial publications about constitutional government to be widely used by scholars, judges, and teachers. Contribute professional development in curricula and classrooms around the region and the nation.
 “Sloan Foundation”, New York, New York  Promotes carefully reasoned and systematic understanding of the forces of nature and society, through research and broad-based education related to science, technology, and economic performance; and the quality of American life. A focus on science, technology, and economic institutions.
 “Guggenheim Foundation”, New York, New York. "Midcareer" awards for demonstrated exceptional capacity for productive scholarship or exceptional creative ability in the arts. An annual award for U.S./Canada and one for Latin America/Caribbean. Numbers of them are elected to the American Academy of Arts and Sciences.
 “The Scherer Center for the Study of American Culture”, Chicago, Illinois. To develop scholarship in American culture and broadcast it. Within various disciplines, connect History, Philosophy, Political Science, Economics, Public Policy, the Law School—and—Social Thought, Sociology, Psychology, Anthropology, Divinity School—and—Art History, Cinema, Media, Visual and Music – and—English, Romance Languages, Linguistics.

Journals
 "Journal of Interdisciplinary History", Boston, Massachusetts. Employ the methods and insights of multiple disciplines in the study of past times to bring a historical perspective to economics, demographics, politics, sociology and psychology.
 “Omohundro Institute of Early American History and Culture”, Williamsburg, Virginia. Early American history and culture. From early contacts to 1820. Geographically, North America— French, Spanish, British, the Caribbean, Europe and West Africa. History, literature, law, political science, and cultural studies, anthropology, archaeology.

Education
  “National Endowment for the Humanities” (NEH), Washington, DC.  Serves and strengthens our Republic by promoting excellence in the humanities and conveying the lessons of history to all Americans. Cultural resources for educational programs, reflecting our diverse heritage, traditions, and history. Relating the humanities to the current national life.
 “”National Archives” and Records Administration", Washington, DC . The Archives and its foundation preserve and present the records of the actions of Federal Government since 1790—interpreting relating each document to the rights of American citizens, the actions of Federal officials, and the national experience. Network archives, records centers, online.
 “Annenberg Foundation”, Los Angeles, California. Development of more effective ways to share ideas and knowledge. Multimedia resources help teachers increase their expertise in their fields and assist them in improving their teaching methods. Programs are for students and viewers at home, exemplifying excellent teaching.
 “Gilder Lehrman Institute”, New York, NY. Study and love of American history through programs and resources for students, teachers, scholars, and history enthusiasts. Work with history-focused schools; organize development programs for teachers; Print and digital publications and traveling exhibits; resources for K–12 teachers and students.
 “American Academy of Arts & Sciences”, Cambridge, Mass. Independent policy research for multidisciplinary studies of complex and emerging problems and practical policy alternatives. Fosters public engagement and mentors new scholars and thinkers. Elected members are leaders in the academic disciplines, the arts, business, and public affairs.
 “Madison’s Montpelier”, Orange, Virginia. Non-partisan organization dedicated to the study and teaching of founding principles and constitutional ideals for American self-government. A goal of becoming the nation's leading resource in Constitutional education. A teaching academy for scholars, teachers, judges, and elected officials, U.S. and abroad.
 “Woodrow Wilson International Center for Scholars", Washington, DC. Congress established, non-partisan, to unite the world of ideas to the world of policy. Scholarship and linking scholarship to issues of concern to Washington. Particularly study of international affairs, executive branch and Congress in a broad context in a long view.

External links

Pauline Maier MIT homepage. Maier was a Professor of American History there from 1979 until her death.

Interview with Maier on American Scripture: Making the Declaration of Independence, Booknotes, August 17, 1997.
Interview with Maier, In Depth, March 6, 2011
 

1938 births
2013 deaths

Alumni of the London School of Economics
Radcliffe College alumni
Historians of the American Revolution
MIT School of Humanities, Arts, and Social Sciences faculty
American textbook writers
Women textbook writers
Fellows of the American Academy of Arts and Sciences
American women historians
21st-century American women